Colombo (Sinhala: කොළඹ) is a 2021 Sri Lankan action thriller film directed by Asama Randil Liyanage and produced by Anusha Sanjeewa Edirimuni for Bees Production along with co-production by Athula Liyanage and Harindra Achalanka Kulasuriya. It stars Hemal Ranasinghe, Dharmapriya Dias, Nishan Kumara, Kumara Thirimadura, Rukmal Nirosh, and Jehan Appuhamy.

The film mostly received positive reviews from critics.

Production
The production of the film began in 2016. The film was officially released on 18 March 2021 under EAP Theaters island wide. The premiere of the film was held at the Savoy Primer in Wellawatte. The theme of the film is 'Colombo is not a city but a life'.

Cast

Release
The first release of the film took place on 18 March 2021. Then the film was screened for 42 days when the cinemas closed on May 01 due to second COVID-19 wave. Later, the second screening of the film was start on 15 July 2021 amidst of third COVID-19 wave.

References

External links
 

2021 films
2020s Sinhala-language films